Thamiaraea is a genus of beetles belonging to the family Staphylinidae.

The genus was described in 1858 by Carl Gustaf Thomson.

The genus has cosmopolitan distribution.

Species:
 Thamiaraea hospita (Märkel, 1844)
 Thamiaraea tsitsilasi Pace

References

Staphylinidae
Staphylinidae genera